Ramūnas Butautas (born 22 May 1964 in Kaunas) is a Lithuanian professional basketball coach who last coached Lietkabelis Panevėžys of the Lithuanian Basketball League. He is the son of Stepas Butautas. In 2017, Butautas was elected as the head coach for Lebanon national basketball team.

Career
On December 28, 2006, the executive committee of Basketball Federation of Lithuania unanimously decided that Butautas would become the head coach of the Lithuanian national men's basketball team. In December 2009, he was appointed as the head coach of Žalgiris Kaunas. On February 9, 2010, Butautas was released from Žalgiris. On March 16, 2011, Butautas was appointed head coach of VEF Rīga. In June 2013 he signed a three-year extension with VEF Rīga, but following a disappointing season was relieved of his duties in June 2014. He also coached Astana, winning the national championship in 2015. He left the team after a disappointing season in 2016. On December 29, 2017, he became the head coach of Lietkabelis Panevėžys of the Lithuanian Basketball League.

National level
 2003: Lithuania U-19 second coach
 2004: Lithuania U-20 head coach
 2005: Lithuania U-21 head coach
 2007–2009: Lithuania national basketball team head coach
 2017-: Lithuania U-20 head coach
 2017-: Lebanon national basketball team head coach

Achievements
 Silver in 2003 FIBA Under-19 World Championship
 Bronze 2004 FIBA Europe Under-20 Championship
 Gold in 2005 FIBA Under-21 World Championship
 LKL bronze medalist – 2004, 2005
 BBL bronze medalist – 2005, 2008, 2012
 BBL silver medalist – 2011
 Latvian league bronze medalist – 2006
 Latvian league champion – 2007, 2011, 2012, 2013
 Bronze in EuroBasket 2007
 Latvian league silver medalist – 2008, 2014
 Kazakhstan Basketball Championship champion – 2015

References

External links
  Lithuanian Basketball League 

1964 births
Living people
Sportspeople from Kaunas
ASK Riga coaches
BC Astana coaches
BC Žalgiris coaches
Lithuanian basketball coaches
BC Lietkabelis coaches